Adjutor Rivard (22 January 1868 – 17 July 1945) was a lawyer, writer, judge and linguist from Quebec, Canada.

He studied at the Petit séminaire de Québec and Université Laval. He co-founded the Société du parler français au Canada (SPFC) and is recognized as one of the principal authors of the Glossaire du parler français au Canada published by the SPFC in 1930. With Mgr Louis-Nazaire Bégin, he also co-founded the L'Action catholique review.

Writing career
Rivard was something of a traditionalist as can be seen in his somewhat syrupy description of country life as portrayed in Chez Nous.

Works
 L'art de dire: traité de lecture et de récitation, 1898
 Manuel de la parole, 1901
 Bibliographie du parler français au Canada: catalogue analytique des ouvrages traitant de la langue française au Canada (with James Geddes) 
 Chez nous, 1914 (Translation by William Hume Blake, 1861-1924)
 Études sur les parlers de France au Canada, 1914
 Chez nos gens, 1918, (Prix de l'Académie française)
 De la liberté de la presse, 1923 
 Glossaire du parler français au Canada, 1930

References

Further reading
 Claude Verreault. "Adjutor Rivard (1868-1945)", in the site of the Laboratoire de lexicologie et lexicographie québécoises, 2007 [French]

External links
 

1868 births
1945 deaths
Judges in Quebec
Lawyers in Quebec
Linguists from Canada
Université Laval alumni
Writers from Quebec